was an airline with its headquarters on the grounds of Fukuoka Airport in Hakata-ku, Fukuoka, Japan. It was owned by Japan Air System (later Japan Airlines Domestic in 2004), operating domestic passenger services.

Scheduled flights were wholly sold by Japan Airlines, therefore no ticket carried JH. Essentially, Japan Airlines wet leased them.

History

The airline was established on 20 January 1997 and started operations on 19 December of that same year as an affiliate of Japan Air System. 

In November 2001, JAS was absorbed by Japan Airlines. On April 30, 2005, Harlequin Air was integrated into Japan Airlines Domestic.

Destinations

Fleet
During its eight-year existence, Harlequin Air operated only two aircraft (both leased from its parent Japan Air System):

See also
List of defunct airlines of Japan

References

External links

Japanese language site with photos of Harlequin livery

Defunct airlines of Japan
Airlines established in 1997
Airlines disestablished in 2005
Japan Airlines
Fukuoka